Piedmont is a city in northwestern Wayne County in Southeast Missouri, United States. Its population was 1,897 at the 2020 census. Part of the Ozark Foothills Region, it is at the convergence of State Highways 34 and 49. Piedmont, transliterated as "foot of the mountain," is named for its position at the foot of Clark Mountain, a 1424-foot summit approximately two miles north of the town.

History
Piedmont was platted in 1871 when the Iron Mountain Railroad was extended south to that point. The community derives its name from the French pied and mont, meaning "foot" and "mountain" respectively. A post office called Piedmont has been in operation since 1872.

Geography

Piedmont includes the neighborhood of Beckville.

Nearby Clearwater Lake, a flood-control lake that was constructed in the 1940s and managed by the U.S. Army Corps of Engineers, brings substantial seasonal tourism to Piedmont for boating, fishing, and camping.

Demographics

2010 census
As of the census of 2010, there were 1,977 people, 823 households, and 500 families residing in the city. The racial makeup of the city was 96.5% White, 0.5% African American, 0.3% Native American, 1.0% Asian, 0.8% from other races, and 1.1% from two or more races. Hispanic or Latino of any race were 1.4% of the population.

There were 823 households, of which 31.3% had children under the age of 18 living with them, 43.1% were married couples living together, 11.8% had a female householder with no husband present, 5.8% had a male householder with no wife present, and 39.2% were non-families. 33.5% of all households were made up of individuals, and 15.3% had someone living alone who was 65 years of age or older. The average household size was 2.32 and the average family size was 2.90.

The median age in the city was 42.9 years. 22.4% of residents were under the age of 18; 9.2% were between the ages of 18 and 24; 21.3% were from 25 to 44; 26% were from 45 to 64; and 21.1% were 65 years of age or older. The gender makeup of the city was 46.1% male and 53.9% female.

2000 census
As of the census of 2000, there were 1,992 people, 869 households, and 528 families residing in the city. The population density was 955.5 people per square mile (369.8/km). There were 959 housing units at an average density of 460.0 per square mile (178.0/km). The racial makeup of the city was 98.09% White, 0.16% African American, 0.40% Native American, 0.35% Asian, 0.20% from other races, and 0.80% from two or more races. Hispanic or Latino of any race were 0.60% of the population. Among the major first ancestries reported in Piedmont were 21.4% American, 11.6% German, 11.3% Irish, 8.6% English, 3.7% Dutch, and 2.5% French.

There were 869 households, out of which 28.5% had children under the age of 18 living with them, 44.1% were married couples living together, 13.5% had a female householder with no husband present, and 39.2% were non-families. 35.9% of all households were made up of individuals, and 23.0% had someone living alone who was 65 years of age or older. The average household size was 2.19 and the average family size was 2.79.

In the city the population was spread out, with 23.3% under the age of 18, 6.7% from 18 to 24, 23.6% from 25 to 44, 20.7% from 45 to 64, and 25.8% who were 65 years of age or older. The median age was 42 years. For every 100 females there were 85.0 males. For every 100 females age 18 and over, there were 76.2 males.

The median income for a household in the city was $24,678, and the median income for a family was $23,500. Males had a median income of $27,120 versus $17,500 for females. The per capita income for the city was $11,976. About 24.3% of families and 26.5% of the population were below the poverty line, including 34.7% of those under age 18 and 16.6% of those age 65 or over.

Education 
Among residents 25 years of age and older in Piedmont, 36.1% possess a high school diploma or higher, 7.5% have a bachelor's degree, and 3.9% hold a post-graduate/professional degree as their highest educational attainment.

Public schools
The Clearwater R-I School District serves the educational needs of most of the city's residents and nearby throughout most of western Wayne County. According to the Missouri Department of Elementary & Secondary Education, there is one elementary school, one middle school and one senior high school in the district. During the 2008–2009 school year, there was a total of 1,110 students and 111 certified staff members enrolled in the Clearwater R-I School District. The school colors are orange and black and its mascot is the tiger.
 Clearwater Elementary School (PK-4)
 Clearwater Middle School (5-8)
 Clearwater High School (9-12)

Private schools
 Victory Baptist Academy (PK-12)

Library
Piedmont has a lending library, the Piedmont Public Library.

Government

City/local
The City of Piedmont is governed by Mayor William H. "Bill" Kirkpatrick and a four-member city council. Meetings are held on the second Tuesday of each month at 6:00 p.m. Central Standard Time (CST) at Piedmont City Hall, 115 W. Green Street.

Piedmont Elected City Officials
 Mayor: William H. "Bill" Kirkpatrick
 Ward I Aldermen: Linda Palmer and Karin Townsend
 Ward II Aldermen: Kyle Allen and Scott Tucker
 City Collector: Bill McMurry
 Chief of Police: Richard Sanders

Piedmont Appointed City Officials
 City Clerk: Tammy Thurman
 City Treasurer: Dennis Ross
 City Attorney: Robert Ramshur

State
Piedmont is a part of Missouri's 144th Legislative District and is currently represented by Chris Dinkins (R-Annapolis, Missouri). In the Missouri Senate, State Senator Wayne Wallingford (R-Cape Girardeau, Missouri) represents Piedmont as part of Missouri's 27th Senatorial District.

Federal
Piedmont is included in Missouri's 8th congressional district and is currently represented in the U.S. House of Representatives by Jason T. Smith (R-Salem, Missouri).

Climate
Piedmont has a humid subtropical climate (Köppen climate classification Cfa).

Arts and culture
Piedmont was once known for its two nearby drive-in theaters, the Pine Hill Drive-In and the 21 Drive-In near Van Buren. Pine Hill Drive-In closed in 2015.

Since 1977 Piedmont has hosted an Ozark Heritage Fall Festival annually in mid-October, which showcases traditional Ozark culture and handicrafts, and is one of the highest attended in the region.

Notable people
 Robert Banks, award-winning chemist and co-inventor of "crystalline polypropylene" and high-density polyethylene (HDPE).

References

External links
 City of Piedmont website
 Wayne County Journal Banner
 Historic maps of Piedmont in the Sanborn Maps of Missouri Collection at the University of Missouri

Cities in Wayne County, Missouri
1871 establishments in Missouri
Cities in Missouri